Dire may refer to:

Places
Diré, a town in Tombouctou Region, Mali
Diré Cercle, an administrative subdivision of Tombouctou Region, Mali
Dire (Aanaa), a woreda in Oromia Region, Ethiopia

People
Dire Tladi (born 1975), South African law professor
Dire Tune (born 1985), Ethiopian runner

Other uses
Dire (band), an American heavy metal band
Dire, a team in the MOBA video game Dota 2
Dire, a fictional character in the anime JoJo's Bizarre Adventure

See also
Dire Dawa (disambiguation)
Dire Straits (disambiguation)
Dire wolf (disambiguation)